Medicine Lodge may refer to:

 Medicine Lodge, Alberta, Canada
 Medicine Lodge, Kansas, United States
 Medicine lodge (sauna), a ceremonial sauna

See also
 Medicine Lodge River, tributary of the Salt Fork of the Arkansas River in Kansas and Oklahoma, United States
 Medicine Lodge Township,  township in Barber County, Kansas, United States
 Medicine Lodge Treaty, overall name for three treaties signed between the Federal government of the United States and southern Plains Indian tribes in October 1867